Trigon is a public art work by American artist Allen Ditson, located in downtown Milwaukee, Wisconsin. The loosely figurative artwork was purchased by the four daughters of Mr. and Mrs. A.P. Rosenberg in their memory at the time of construction of the Performing Arts Center. It is located on the East Kilbourn side of the Performing Arts Center near the Peck Pavilion and a grove of horse chestnut trees.

References

Outdoor sculptures in Milwaukee
1970 sculptures
Steel sculptures in Wisconsin
Stainless steel sculptures in the United States